DocuBox is a European premium television channel and video on demand service owned by SPI International, a division of Canal+ Group. It features documentary films covering nature, science, culture and human civilization.

History
DocuBox first launched in 2011.

DocuBox launched in the Netherlands on 3 May 2021.

References

Television channels in the Netherlands
SPI International
Television channels and stations established in 2011